W260CB (99.9 FM, "The Detroit Praise Network") is a radio translator in Detroit. Owned by Beasley Broadcast Group, it relays an urban gospel format broadcast by WDMK-HD2, which is also simulcast on W260CB 99.9, W252BX 98.3, and WMGC-HD2. The stations are collectively branded as The Detroit Praise Network.

History 
W260CB first launched in 2000 as W206BI on 89.1 MHz as a repeater of Toledo, Ohio's WGTE-FM, covering the Hamtramck area. In 2010, it would move to 99.9 MHz as W260CB and become an FM repeater of AM 1200, before experimenting with a format of retro soul hits in early 2018.  This would end when the station was purchased by Urban One, who relocated their Praise Radio station from WPZR (102.7 FM) upon that station's sale to the Educational Media Foundation on May 1, 2018.  Upon moving to 99.9 and launching on August 9, 2018, the station acquired two repeaters (W228CJ in Oak Park and W252BX in Southwest Detroit) from the EMF to fill in gaps in coverage in the area.  W228CJ has since flipped to sports on August 30, 2021.

Coverage area 
W228CJ broadcasts from the WMYD-DT 20 / WTVS 56 television tower in Oak Park on 8 Mile Road and Meyers Road, covering most of Detroit and Highland Park.  W252BX 98.3 broadcasts from a transmitter on top of the Renaissance Center, covering Dearborn, River Rouge, Melvindale and Redford Township.  W260CB broadcasts from the WRIF/WCSX/WMGC-FM broadcast tower in Royal Oak Charter Township, covering Southfield, Farmington Hills and Bloomfield Hills.

References

External links 
 
 
 
 
 
 

Beasley Broadcast Group radio stations
Radio stations established in 2000
Radio stations established in 2018
260CB
2000 establishments in Michigan
260CB